Abdujalil Akhadovich Samadov (November 4, 1949 – March 18, 2004) was a Tajik politician. He was the fourth prime minister of Tajikistan between December 18, 1993, and December 2, 1994.

Note
Notelist

References

1949 births
2004 deaths
Samadov, Abdujalil Akhadovich
People from Khujand